Gérard Rinaldi (February 17, 1943 – March 2, 2012) was a French actor, musician, lyricist, artistic director and singer with Les Charlots.

Career

Death
Rinaldi died of lymphoma on March 2, 2012. He was 69. A few days later, holding back his tears Jean Sarrus (Les Charlots) paid homage to his friend and had this to say about him : "Gérard was the soul of Les Charlots. He excelled in everything he did : he had this wonderful singing voice, but mostly as a writer, that's what he liked to do above everything else : writing songs. I admired his great sense of humor and his ability to laugh about everything, all the time. As he was dying, he even made us laugh about his cancer, I saw him on his hospital bed and he just tried to make me laugh in spite of the morphine kicking in. I'm going to miss him a lot." Luis Rego (Les Charlots) also reacted to his friend's death, saying that he was very sad and had a lot of admiration for Gérard Rinaldi : "he was so gifted that he would have had a great career even without Les Charlots".
 
Ten days after Rinaldi's death, the theatre world was reunited at Le Théâtre de la Michodière in Paris for a special homage. Ex-members of Les Charlots Jean Sarrus, Jean-Guy Fechner and Richard Bonnot (Rinaldi's replacement in the group from 1986 to 1992) were present to pay their respects. Actors Gérard Jugnot, Marie-Anne Chazel, Marie-Pierre Casey, Marthe Villalonga and many others paid their respects to their friend.

The Théâtre de la Michodière was chosen for the homage, because Rinaldi had appeared there four times in his stage career 1986 Double Mixte, 1992 La Puce à L'Oreille, 1994 Bobosse, 2004 Le Canard à l'Orange.

Partial filmography

 La grande java (1971) - Philippot
 Daisy Town (1971)
 Les Bidasses en folie (1971) - Gérard
 Stadium Nuts (1972) - Gérard
 Les Charlots font l'Espagne (1972) - Gérard
 The Big Store (1973) - Gérard
 I Don't Know Much, But I'll Say Everything (1973) - Un soldat (uncredited)
 Les quatre Charlots mousquetaires (1974) - Planchet
 Les Charlots en folie: À nous quatre Cardinal! (1974) - Planchet
 Les bidasses s'en vont en guerre (1974) - Gérard
 Trop c'est trop (1975)
 Bons Baisers de Hong Kong (1975) - Gérard
 Et vive la liberté! (1978) - Gérard
 Les Charlots en délire (1979) - Gérard de
 Les Charlots contre Dracula (1980) - Gérard
 Le retour des bidasses en folie (1983) - Un bidasse
 Charlots connection (1984) - Gérard
 Descente aux enfers (1986) - Elvis
 La vie dissolue de Gérard Floque (1986) - Francis Clément
 Funny Boy (1987) - Lambros
 Feu sur le candidat (1990) - Le flic à RTL
 Al centro dell'area di rigore (1996) - Oreste
 Quelqu'un de bien (2002) - Directeur thalasso 1
 Après la pluie, le beau temps (2003) - José Bretelle

Roles of note 
 Watership Down - Hazel (French dub)
 The Great Mouse Detective - Ratigan (French dub)
 An American Tail - Henri (French dub)
 The Little Mermaid (1989 film) - Chef Louis (French dub)
 A Goofy Movie - Goofy (French dub)
 Balto - Steele (French dub)
 An All Dogs Christmas Carol - Charlie Barkin (French dub)
 Rocko's Modern Life - Heffer (French dub)
 Tarzan - Clayton (French dub)
 The Simpsons - Mr. Burns (French dub)
 Father of the Pride - Larry (French dub)

References

1943 births
2012 deaths
Deaths from cancer in France
Deaths from lymphoma
French people of Italian descent
French male voice actors
Male actors from Paris
Singers from Paris
20th-century French male singers